The Best American Short Stories 1994, a volume in The Best American Short Stories series, was edited by Katrina Kenison and by guest editor Tobias Wolff.

Short stories included

References

External links
 Best American Short Stories

1994 anthologies
Fiction anthologies
Short Stories 1994
Houghton Mifflin books